The Agusta A.106 was a single-seat light helicopter designed to provide an anti-submarine warfare (ASW) platform for the Impavido-class destroyers of the Italian Navy. The aircraft was provided with a sophisticated electronics suite by Ferranti for autostabilisation and contact identification. Two torpedoes could be slung under the fuselage. The tail and two-bladed main rotor could be folded for shipboard stowage, and the skid undercarriage had fittings for flotation bags.

Two prototypes were built, the first flying in November 1965. A pre-production batch of 5 was cancelled by the Navy in 1973.

Operators

 Italian Navy (Marina Militare) for evaluation only

Specifications

See also

References

 
 

Agusta aircraft
1960s Italian anti-submarine aircraft
Anti-submarine helicopters
1960s Italian helicopters
Single-turbine helicopters
Aircraft first flown in 1965